Seychelles competed at the 2010 Summer Youth Olympics, the inaugural Youth Olympic Games, held in Singapore from August 14 to August 26, 2010. The nation was represented by the Seychelles Olympic and Commonwealth Games Association, which sent a total of four athletes to compete in four sports. The flagbearer at the opening ceremony for the nation was badminton player Kervin Ghislain. Seychelles' Olympic team was one of the 106 that did not win a single medal at the Games.

Athletics

Sole competitor for the nation in athletics Marie-Michell Athanase, competing in the girls' 200 metres, set a season best with a time of 27.10 seconds but failed to make it into the medal final. She progressed to the B Final (non-medal final), where she set a personal best in the event with a time of 26.44 seconds.

Girls
Track and Road Events

Badminton

Kervin Ghislain, the sole competitor in badminton for Seychelles, played three matches in the group play of the boys' singles, and was defeated in all three. As such he did not advance to the quarterfinals and beyond.

Boxing

Boxer Stan Nicette competed in the men's bantam 54kg. In the preliminaries, he fought against Robeisy Eloy Ramirez of Cuba and lost with a score of 17–3, thus did not progress to the semifinals.

Boys

Swimming

Shannon Austin was the only Seychellois athlete at the 2010 Summer Youth Olympics to compete in more than one event; namely, the girls' 200 metres freestyle and the girls' 400 metres freestyle. Despite clinching a second place in heat 2 of the girls' 200 metres freestyle, her timing was not enough to secure her a place in the final. She did not progress to the final either in the girls' 400 metres freestyle.

See also 
 Seychelles at the Olympics

References

External links
Competitors List: Seychelles – Singapore 2010 official site
 Schedule/Results – Singapore 2010 official site

2010 in Seychelles
Nations at the 2010 Summer Youth Olympics
Seychelles at the Youth Olympics